for others with the same name, see Rudolf Steiner (disambiguation)

Rudolf Steiner (born January 16, 1951) is a retired track and field athlete from Switzerland, who competed in the men's javelin throw event during his career. He represented his native country at the 1988 Summer Olympics in Seoul, South Korea, where he didn't reach the final after throwing 76.02 metres in the qualification round.

Achievements

References 

1951 births
Living people
Swiss male javelin throwers
Athletes (track and field) at the 1988 Summer Olympics
Olympic athletes of Switzerland